Vice Admiral Philip John Hally,  is a senior Royal Navy officer who currently serves as Chief of Defence People.

Naval career
Hally joined the Royal Navy on 18 September 1991. He served as logistics officer on the aircraft carrier  as part of the relief effort for Typhoon Haiyan in 2013. He went on to become Programme Leader for the Defence Support Network Transformation Programme in September 2014, Assistant Chief of Staff Resources and Plans in November 2017, and Assistant Chief of the Naval Staff, People Transformation in May 2019. After that, he became Naval Secretary in January 2020. He was promoted to vice-admiral on 12 December 2022, and became Chief of Defence People in January 2023.

Hally was appointed Member of the Order of the British Empire (MBE) on 26 February 2015, and was made an Honorary Captain of the Volunteer Cadet Corps in December 2019. He was appointed Companion of the Order of the Bath (CB) in the 2021 Birthday Honours.

References

|-

Living people
Royal Navy rear admirals
Companions of the Order of the Bath
Members of the Order of the British Empire
Royal Navy personnel of the Iraq War
Year of birth missing (living people)